David Loeb (born May 11, 1939) is an American composer of contemporary classical music.  Born in New York City, he has written extensively for early music instruments such as the viol, as well as instruments from China and Japan. He teaches at the Mannes College The New School for Music, and has additionally served as a member of the composition faculty at the Curtis Institute of Music.

His notable students include Jennifer Higdon, Jeremy Beck, and Craig Walsh.

Works
 Ancient Legends
 Andorran Fantasy
 Balinese Fantasies (Published by ALRY Publications)
 Between Sea and Sky
 Cantata for Oboe and String Orchestra
 Caprices for Solo Mandolin Vol. 1-2
 Chanson Malagache
 A Distant Land Unfurled
 Fantasia on a Theme of Yuize
 Fantasia on Pyong-si-jo No. 1-2
 Fantasia sobre "Una Hiji Tiene del Rey"
 Fantasias for the Japanese Consort
 Ganya
 Imagined Landscapes
 Keisho for Theorbo Solo
 The Meeting of Sea and Clouds
 Nocturne for Mandolin and Guitar
 Prelude for Two Consorts
 Quartet for flute, guitar, violin, and cello
 Riddles
 Rivermist in Summer
 Sonata No. 1-6 for Cello Solo
 Sonata for Trombone and Piano No. 1 (1998)
 Sonata for Trombone and Piano No. 2 (2000)
 Sonata for Trombone and Piano No. 3 (2003)
 Sonata for Trombone and Piano No. 4 (2004)
 Sonata for Trombone and Piano No. 5 (2005)
 Seiya
 Symphony for Mandolin orchestra
 Three Fantasias on East Asian Modes
 Tre Romanze
 Trois Cansos
 Two Views of the Silent Waterfall
 Utagumi
 Yoru Ga Mau

Books
 Loeb, David. Chinese & Japanese Musical Instruments and Their Notation. Harold Branch, 1972.

Sources

 Loeb, David: The life and times of a viola composer, Journal of the Viola da Gamba Society of America. 22 (1985), p. 29-34.
 Anderson, Ruth. Contemporary American composers. A biographical dictionary, 1st edition, G. K. Hall, 1976.
 Press, Jaques Cattell (Ed.). Who's who in American Music. Classical, first edition. R. R. Bowker, 1983.

External links
David Loeb official site

Loeb, David (composer)
Loeb, David (composer)
Loeb, David (composer)
Loeb, David (composer)
Loeb, David (composer)
Loeb, David (composer)
Jewish American classical composers
20th-century American composers
20th-century American male musicians
21st-century American Jews